= Christian Beaulieu =

Canadian biomedical engineer

Christian Beaulieu is a Canadian biomedical engineer, currently a Canada Research Chair at University of Alberta.
